Theodore H. Berlin (8 May 1917, New York City – 16 November 1962, Baltimore) was an American theoretical physicist.

Education and career 
Berlin graduated in 1939 with B.S. in chemical engineering from Cooper Union. He graduated in 1940 with M.S. and in 1944 with Ph.D. from the University of Michigan. His thesis advisor was Kasimir Fajans.

He was a research physicist from 1944 to 1946 at the University of Michigan, a lecturer from 1946 to 1947 at Johns Hopkins University, and an associate professor from 1948 to 1949 at Northwestern University. At Johns Hopkins University he was from 1949 to 1954 an associate professor and from 1955 to 1961 a full professor. As a Guggenheim Fellow for the academic year 1952–1953, he was at the Institute for Advanced Study on leave of absence from Johns Hopkins. From 1961 until his death from a heart attack in 1962 he was a full professor at The Rockefeller University.

Berlin was a Fellow of the American Physical Society. He was an associate editor for the Journal of Chemical Physics, Physical Review, and Physical Review Letters. He was appointed to the editorial board of The Physics of Fluids, starting on 1 January 1962. His doctoral students include Louis Witten.

Scientific output 
At the beginning of his career, Berlin did research on physical chemistry (quantum theory of molecules). He is known for his work with Kac on the spherical model, a generalization of the Ising model of statistical mechanics, which was developed as a mathematical model for ferromagnetism. In contrast to the Ising model, the spherical model's spin variable on the lattice can assume continuous values (with the restriction that the sum of the squares of the spins is equal to the number of lattice positions). The spherical model can be solved exactly in the presence of an external field and shares that property of exact solvability with very few models of ferromagnetism.

Personal life 
In 1944 Berlin married Patricia May Cleary. They had sons Geoffrey N., Dennis A., Michael K., and Alexander L. A daughter died in infancy.

References

1917 births
1962 deaths
Cooper Union alumni
University of Michigan alumni
Johns Hopkins University faculty
20th-century American physicists
Fellows of the American Physical Society